Félix Cote-Bouvette is a Canadian bicycle racer, currently with the H&R Block Pro Cycling team.

References

1993 births
Living people
Canadian male cyclists
People from Lachine, Quebec
Cyclists from Montreal